Abel Fuentes García (born November 26, 1993, in Juchitán de Zaragoza) is a Mexican professional footballer who last played for Tuxtla.

Honours

Club
Chapulineros de Oaxaca
 Liga de Balompié Mexicano: 2020–21, 2021

References

External links
 

1993 births
Living people
Tigres UANL footballers
C.D. Guadalajara footballers
Alebrijes de Oaxaca players
Universidad Autónoma de Zacatecas FC footballers
Cruz Azul Hidalgo footballers
Tuxtla F.C. footballers
Liga MX players
Ascenso MX players
Liga Premier de México players
Tercera División de México players
Footballers from Oaxaca
Association footballers not categorized by position
People from Juchitán de Zaragoza
Liga de Balompié Mexicano players
Mexico under-20 international footballers
Mexican footballers